Mavro Orbini (1563–1614) was a Ragusan chronicler, notable for his work The Realm of the Slavs (1601) which influenced Slavic ideology and historiography in the later centuries.

Life
Orbini was born in Ragusa (now Dubrovnik), the capital of the Republic of Ragusa, a Slavic-populated merchant city-state on the eastern shore of the Adriatic sea. His name in Slavic was written by himself as Mavar Orbin. He was mentioned for the first time in sources dating to 1592.

At 15 years old, he joined the Benedictines, and after becoming a monk, he lived for a while in the monasteries on the island of Mljet and later in Ston, and in the Kingdom of Hungary, where he was the abbot of the Benedictine monastery in Bačka (in Serbia) for a couple of years. Then he returned to Ragusa, where he spent the rest of his life.

Like most Dalmatian intellectuals of his time, he was familiar with the pan-Slavic ideology of Vinko Pribojević. He made a very important contribution to that ideology by writing The Realm of the Slavs in Italian, a historical/ideological book published in Pesaro in 1601. This uncritical history of the South Slavs was translated into Russian by Sava Vladislavich in 1722, with a preface by Feofan Prokopovich. From then on, the book exerted a significant influence on the ideas of Slavic peoples about themselves and on the European ideas on Slavs.

Like Pribojević, Orbini unifies the Illyrian and Slavic mythic identities and interprets history from a pan-Slavic mythological position. Since Orbini lived on the very edge of the Slavic free lands, he glorified the multitude of Slavic peoples (primarily Russians and Poles) to counteract the aggressiveness of the Germanic, Italian (Venice) and Ottoman empires. One of Orbini's probable sources was Ludovik Crijević Tuberon.

Orbini also published a book in Serbo-Croatian, Spiritual Mirror (1595), which was essentially a translation of the Italian work by Angelo Nelli. This text, translated into the "Ragusan language", as Orbin called the local Slavic vernacular, has cultural and historical importance as an example of prose of the 16th century. His work was one of few primary sources about the 1385 Battle of Savra, although it contains many incorrect and imprecise data about this battle.

Legacy
Aside from its ideological background, Orbin's main work was used for a long time as one of the few sources for segments of late medieval history of the South Slavs, from Carinthia and the Slovene Lands to Serbia and Bulgaria. Even today's historiography is often uncertain about how much truth there is in some of his writings and claims.

Orbin's work The Realm of the Slavs was also the main source used by Paisius of Hilendar to write his Istoriya Slavyanobolgarskaya, the most influential work of early Bulgarian historiography, in 1762. He is referred to in the book as "a certain Mavrubir, a Latin", and is generally discredited despite being often cited.

He has been called the "Dalmatian Thucydides".

Anthropology
Orbin believed that the Slavs hailed from the Goths in Scandinavia. He also claimed that the Illyrians spoke Slavic. He supported Pribojević's view that Alexander the Great and the Macedonians were Slavs.

Works
 De Ultimo Fine Humanæ Vitæ Vel Summo Bono, before 1590
 
 Zarcalo dvhovno... (Spiritual Mirror...), 1606 (published later in 1621 in Venice and in 1703)

See also
 List of notable Ragusans

References

Sources 
 
 

1563 births
1614 deaths
People from the Republic of Ragusa
17th-century writers
Ragusan writers
Ragusan historians
Ragusan Benedictines
Year of birth unknown
Pan-Slavism
Historians of the Balkans
Benedictine abbots
People from Dubrovnik
16th-century Christian monks